Luc Héry (born 13 August 1961) is a French classical violinist.

Biography 
Héry studied the violin with Pierre Doukan and chamber music with Jean Hubeau at the Conservatoire de Paris, where he won a first prize in these two disciplines before entering the third cycle in 1980.

He left the "National" in 1990 to return to it in 1992 as soloist concertmaster, after two years with the Orchestre de Paris in the same concertmaster position. He shared this function with Sarah Nemtanu.

At the same time, he pursued a career as a chamber musician and a soloist, performing with the Orchestre national de France, in particular Henri Dutilleux's Concerto for violin (direction Lawrence Foster) in 1996 and Mozart's Sinfonia Concertante for Violin, Viola and Orchestra (direction Yevgeny Svetlanov) in 2000. He has also recorded Brahm's Clarinet Quintet and Mozart's Clarinet Quintet with the soloists of the Orchestra.

Héry is also a sponsor of the  association.

External links 
 Luc Héry, violon soliste de l'ONF (France Musique)
 Discography (Discogs)
 youtube.com Interview of Luc Hery (YouTube)
 Alban BERG - Concerto "à la mémoire d'un ange" - Luc HÉRY, violon (YouTube)
 Website of the Tournesol, Artistes à l'hôpital association

1961 births
Living people
20th-century French male classical violinists
Academic staff of the Conservatoire de Paris
Conservatoire de Paris alumni
21st-century French male classical violinists